The 2011–12 División de Honor Femenina de Waterpolo was the 25th edition of the Spanish premier women's water polo championship. Defending champion CN Sabadell won all 22 games to win its tenth title.

Teams by autonomous community

Table

Results

Top scorers

References

División de Honor Femenina de Waterpolo
Seasons in Spanish water polo competitions
Spain
Division de Honor
Division de Honor
Division de Honor
Division de Honor